Helena is an unincorporated community in Scott County, Minnesota, United States.

The community is located south-southeast of Jordan along Scott County Road 8 (220th Street West) near Camber Avenue.

Helena Boulevard (Highway 21) is also in the immediate area.

Helena is located within Helena Township and Sand Creek Township.  Nearby places include Jordan and New Prague.

Raven Stream, Sand Creek, and Porter Creek meet at Helena.

References

Unincorporated communities in Minnesota